The Reformed Presbyterian Church in Ethiopia was founded by missionaries of the Orthodox Presbyterian Church United States. It has more than 1,000 members.

The Ethiopian Grace Reformed Church was established in 1998 as part of the Ethiopian Presbyterian Church. At the beginnings there were only 7 believers. Most of them were members of the traditional Ethiopian Orthodox Churches. There were 4 ordained pastors in 2008 who were studied in the United States. It has several outreaches in church planting efforts among Muslims, including Addis Ababa.

The church office is in Addis Ababa.

See also
Grace Reformed Church in Ethiopia

References

Presbyterian denominations in Africa
Presbyterianism in Ethiopia